Angelus Oaks is an unincorporated community in San Bernardino County, California, United States, and has a population of 535 as of the 2010 U.S. Census, up from an estimated population of 312 in 2000.  It is surrounded by the San Bernardino National Forest and located east of San Bernardino on California State Route 38.

History
Angelus Oaks was initially called Camp Angelus.  In 1849 there was a big gold strike in Holcomb Valley, north of Bear Valley and near the town that was later to become Big Bear.  The only way to get supplies in and the gold out was by mule trains.  The mule train traveled up the Santa Ana River Canyon, stopping overnight in Seven Oaks and then took a switch back trail (Clark's Grade; still visible on the mountain across from the Angelus Oaks Lodge) up to the gold fields.  Eventually, a wagon road was built to replace the mule skinner trail.  But, the Santa Ana River kept washing out the wagon road within the rugged canyon, and so another, better road, known as a 'Control Road', (because traffic was allowed to proceed one way in each direction only, with controls stationed at each end) was built in nearby Mill Creek Canyon.  The "Lower Control Road" started at Mountain Home Village, in Mill Creek Canyon, and ended in Camp Angelus, at the Lodge.  (The Lower Control Road later became known as Mountain Home Creek Road.)  "Middle Control Road" started just east of the Lodge and meandered down to Seven Oaks.  The final control road, 'Clark's Grade', went up and over the north side of the Santa Ana Canyon and into Bear Valley.  The Clark Brothers, based at Clark's Ranch north and west of Seven Oaks, scratched out their control road by hand, and collected fees for its use.

In the late 1870s, cattle rustlers, operating out of San Bernardino, would bring their stolen herds up to nearby Glen Martin, just below Camp Angelus in Mountain Home Canyon, to hide them.  Due to the configuration of the opening of the mountain down by the Ranger Station, the opening to the canyon was not visible to posses passing by searching for the stolen herds.

Beginning in the late 1800s and early 1900s, the stagecoach, using the old wagon road, would bring passengers and mail from Redlands up Mill Creek, then Mountain Home Creek (Lower Control Road), through Camp Angelus, on to Seven Oaks via Middle Control Road and then up the back side of the mountain to Big Bear.  The now Angelus Oaks Lodge was first built as a stagecoach stop for changing horses at the top of the climb and for serving up sandwiches to passengers.  It also served as a small grocery store for the local community.  The original wagon road is the small road that now runs along the front of the Lodge and crosses over to the current chain up turn-out (Middle Control Road).

In 1919, with automobiles now traveling up the road to Big Bear, the Angelus Oaks Lodge became a perfect spot to replenish the water in their radiators.  A few cabins were built by two brothers that owned the Lodge at that time.  These crude cabins were nothing more than four walls and contained only cots for sleeping and a wood-burning stove for heat and cooking.

The original school was a log cabin on a hill located behind and rented from Glen Lodge. This lodge had a full restaurant, bar, gas and repair station, grocery store, hotel, cabins, and a dance hall with a large fireplace. In 1953 the first teacher, originally from South Dakota and a graduate of USC, was Orville Young. He lived with his family in Camp Angelus and taught the community children from five to 13 years of age at Camp Angelus Elementary. In 1956 the natural wood clad (later painted red) one-room school-house serving grades one through seven was built, and closed permanently in 2004. Glen Lodge burned down in the late Sixties.

In the 1970s, when the postal service decided to combine the two small post offices of Camp Angelus and Seven Oaks, closing the Seven Oaks location, they renamed the remaining office "Angelus Oaks".  That name stuck with the town.  It was at this time that the Lodge was abandoned and fell into disrepair.

In 1987, the lodge was purchased by a couple living at that time in Long Beach, California.  The lodge and cabins were restored over a two-year period and heaters and showers were added to the cabins.  The lodge and surrounding cabins became a livable resort for individuals wanting to get away from the hectic city life below.  Over the years, full bathrooms, kitchens, and even some dividing walls for bedrooms were added.  Beginning in 2012 and continuing through 2015, the Lodge and its outer cabins once again underwent a major restoration.  As of January 2015, eight of the original 12 cabins have been completely restored, and the Lodge is open for viewing.  The cabins are available to rent on a nightly basis and are operated under a special use permit provided by the USDA Forest Service.

On February 12, 2013, in a rural area east of Angelus Oaks, the search for Christopher Dorner ended after a standoff with the San Bernardino County Sheriff's Department. He was the primary suspect in a series of shootings.

Present day

Its downtown consists of a general store, a restaurant, a post office (ZIP Code 92305) and a real estate office. A San Bernardino County Fire Station (Station 98) is also downtown, and a San Bernardino County Sheriff's Department Resident Deputy (one of only three in the entire County) lives nearby.  The State of California's Department of Transportation (CalTrans) and the United States Forest Service also have a presence in downtown Angelus Oaks.  Two private water companies service the residents of Angelus Oaks.  Within the town lies the historical Angelus Oaks Lodge, which originally served as a stagecoach stop for passengers traveling up the mountain to Big Bear, and is now available for overnight visitors.

Angelus Oaks has become a favorite to bicyclists due to its proximity to the Santa Ana River Trail (S.A.R.T.) which is renowned for its grandeur and challenge.  For hikers, Angelus Oaks offers the San Bernardino Peak Hiking Trail (1W07) and the Vivian Creek Trail.  There are also other less vigorous trails situated throughout the San Gorgonio Wilderness.  The Angelus Oaks Lodge offers a great overnight and staging area for bikers and hikers wishing to get an early morning start.

A few miles past Angelus Oaks, in the Barton Flats area, there are multiple public Forest Service campsites and group camps run by various churches and non-profit organizations, including YMCA and Jewish Community Center of Orange County. The two largest and most active camps are the Boy Scout Camp Tahquitz owned by the Long Beach Boy Scouts (it was developed from a very private summer tent camp with one snack store to one serving thousands of Scouts year round with a mess hall, clinic, garage/fire station, swimming and fishing lake, camp offices, and rangers' quarters developed, built, and maintained under the watchful eye of the Camp Ranger, Glen McIntosh, from 1957 until his death in 1981), and Camp Cedar Falls, 3 miles (5 km) past Angelus Oaks on Highway 38 run by the Seventh-day Adventist Church. Jenks Lake Day Use Area hosts fishing and waterfront activities, including kayaking and canoeing; swimming is not allowed. There are also public restrooms, and many tables and grills for picnics.

Climate
According to the Köppen Climate Classification system, Angelus Oaks, California has a warm-summer Mediterranean climate, abbreviated "Csb" on climate maps.

See also
 Camp Tahquitz

References

External links
 Angelus Oaks Fire & Rescue official site
 Glen Martin Mutual Water Company official site
 Angelus Oaks, CA Community Subreddit

Unincorporated communities in San Bernardino County, California
San Bernardino Mountains
San Bernardino National Forest
Sand to Snow National Monument
Unincorporated communities in California